Matt Stiller (born 14 February 1985) is a Hong Kong cricketer.

He made his first-class debut for Hong Kong against The Netherlands in the 2015–17 ICC Intercontinental Cup tournament on 10 February 2017.

He has since moved into a career as a professional golfer. He is sponsored by TaylorMade and Zebra and recently qualified for the Masters at Augusta in 2023.

References

External links
 

1985 births
Living people
Hong Kong cricketers
Place of birth missing (living people)